Rani Laxmi Bai Memorial Senior Secondary School is a private school located in Lucknow, Uttar Pradesh, India.

It was started in 1979 by founder-manager Sri Jai Pal Singh and has 10 branches around the city including Sec-14 Indira Nagar, Sec-14 Vikas Nagar, Sec - 3 Vikas Nagar, Sec-6 Vikas Nagar, C Block Indira Nagar, Sarvodaya Nagar branch. Sec-14 Indira Nagar branch is the main and biggest branch of the Rani Laxmi Bai Group of Schools. 

Six branches of school are affiliated to Central Board of Secondary Education Delhi and one branch is affiliated to U.P. Board.

The institution made a major contribution to residential schools by sending brilliant though poor students through National Entrance Examination. From 11 students in 1983 when the scheme started, to 125 in 1991 when the scheme was dropped, the institution contributed more than 600 students to residential schools.

The School has a 1000 capacity auditorium attributed to Captain Manoj Kumar Pandey, A Param Vir Chakra Awardee.

Notable alumni
Manoj Kumar Pandey

External links
Schools website 

High schools and secondary schools in Uttar Pradesh
Private schools in Lucknow
Educational institutions established in 1979
1979 establishments in Uttar Pradesh